The 1969 World Fencing Championships were held in Havana, Cuba. The event took place from September 30 to October 12, 1969, at the Ciudad Deportiva Coliseum.

Overview
The Havana World championships were the third straight major fencing event held in the Americas after the 1967 edition in Montreal and the 1968 Summer Olympics in Mexico. Cuba gave the competition political overtones, including it in the celebrations for the ten years of the Cuban Revolution. Fencing was also stopped on 8 October for a commemoration of the anniversary of Che Guevara's death. The United States, who do not have formal diplomatic relations with Cuba, sent a restricted delegation of 25 fencers. The competition was also marred by numerous failures of the electrical apparatus to the heat and humidity.

On sportive terms, the championships were dominated by countries of the Eastern Bloc, especially the Soviet Union, who claimed all three men's team titles. Romania earned their first women's world title.

Results

Men

Women

Medal table

References

Sources
FIE Results
 

World Fencing Championships
F
World Fencing Championships
1960s in Havana
Sports competitions in Havana
World Championships
World Fencing Championships
World Fencing Championships